The Ayam Cemani is a rare breed of chicken from Indonesia. They have a dominant gene that causes hyperpigmentation (fibromelanosis), making the chicken mostly black, including feathers, beak, and internal organs. The Cemani is a very popular gamecock for cockfighting in Bali because their thighs have much more muscle compared to other chickens, which leads to them being much faster.

Etymology
 means "chicken" in Indonesian, while  (originally a Javanese word) means "thoroughly black" (down to the bones).

Origin
As a pure Indonesian breed, the breed originated from the island of Java, Indonesia, and has probably been used since the 12th century for religious and mystical purposes.

The breed was described by Dutch colonial settlers and first imported to Europe in 1998 by Dutch breeder Jan Steverink. Currently, this breed of chicken is kept in the Netherlands, Belgium, Germany, Slovakia, Sweden, Italy and the Czech Republic. Ayam Cemani may have also been brought to Europe by Dutch seamen, for the first selected and most wanted Black Tongue Cemani ship in 2017 to Canada, USA, Ivory Coast, Germany, Cambodia & Thailand ship by Indonesian breeder Rio Ramdhano / R2Cs (Rio Ramdhano Cemani Series) lived in Pangkalpinang, Bangka Belitung Indonesia.

The Congolese-Belgian philanthropist Jean Kiala-Inkisi keeps the largest collection in Africa with 250 breeding pairs. These are preserved in a breeding program by the African Ornamental Breeders Association (AOBA) in Kenya and the Democratic Republic of the Congo.

Description
Their beaks, tongues, combs and wattles appear black, and even their meat, bones, and organs are black or gray. Their blood is normally colored. The birds' black color occurs as a result of excess pigmentation of the tissues, caused by a genetic condition known as fibromelanosis. Fibromelanosis is also found in some other black or blue-skinned chicken breeds, such as the Silkie.

The roosters weigh  and the hens . The hens lay cream-colored eggs, although they are poor setters and rarely hatch their own brood.

See also 
 Melanism

References 

Chicken breeds
Chicken breeds originating in Indonesia